Neil Goldberg may refer to:
 Neil Goldberg (producer)
 Neil Goldberg (artist)